The 2015 FFA Cup preliminary rounds were a qualifying competition to decide 21 of the 32 teams which will take part in the 2015 FFA Cup Round of 32, along with the 10 A-League clubs and reigning National Premier Leagues champion (North Eastern MetroStars SC). The preliminary rounds operated within a consistent national structure whereby club entry into the competition was staggered in each state/territory, with the winning clubs from Round 7 of the preliminary rounds in each member federation gaining direct entry into the Round of 32. All Australian clubs were eligible to enter the qualifying process through their respective FFA member federation, however only one team per club was permitted entry in the competition. Teams from the Northern Territory competed in this competition for the first time.

Schedule

The number of fixtures for each round, and the match dates for each Federation, are as follows.

 Updated from the FFA Cup Website. Some round dates in respective Federations may overlap due to separate scheduling of Zones/Sub-Zones.

Format

The preliminary rounds structure were as follows, and refer to the different levels in the unofficial Australian association football league system :

Qualifying round:
39 Victorian clubs level 8 and below entered this stage.
Byes – 17 Victorian clubs.
First round:
19 Northern New South Wales clubs level 3 and below (North Zone) entered this stage. For Northern NSW, the preliminary rounds would go straight to a penalty shootout in the event that the game is tied at the conclusion of the regular 90 minutes.
20 Queensland clubs level 3 and below entered this stage.
88 Victorian clubs (28 from the previous round and 60 level 6–7) entered this stage.
Byes – 1 NNSW club (from the North Zone), 12 QLD clubs.
Second round:
56 Northern New South Wales clubs (10 from the previous round and 46 level 3 and below) entered this stage.
68 Queensland clubs (16 from the previous round and 52 level 5–7 entered this stage.
80 Victorian clubs (44 from the previous round and 36 level 5–6) entered this stage.
23 Western Australian clubs level 6 and below entered this stage.
Byes – 4 NNSW clubs (2 from the North Zone, 2 from the South Zone), 4 QLD clubs, 7 WA clubs.
Third round:
10 Australian Capital Territory clubs level 3 and below entered this stage.
80 New South Wales clubs level 4 and below entered this stage.
43 Northern New South Wales clubs (30 from the previous round and 13 level 2 and below) entered this stage.
10 Northern Territory clubs level 2 and below entered this stage.
74 Queensland clubs (36 from the previous round and 38 level 5–7 entered this stage.
28 South Australian clubs level 2 and below (plus North Eastern MetroStars as 2014 NPL Champion) entered this stage.
8 Tasmanian clubs level 3 entered this stage.
64 Victorian clubs (40 from the previous round and 24 level 4) entered this stage.
42 Western Australia clubs (15 from the previous round and 27 level 3–5) entered this stage.
Byes – 4 ACT clubs, 32 NSW clubs, 3 NNSW clubs (3 from the North Zone), 6 NT clubs, 2 QLD clubs, 3 SA clubs, 4 TAS clubs.
Fourth round:
14 Australian Capital Territory clubs (7 from the previous round and 7 level 2) entered this stage.
80 New South Wales clubs (56 from the previous round and 24 level 2–3) entered this stage.
23 Northern New South Wales clubs progressed to this stage.
8 Northern Territory clubs progressed to this stage.
42 Queensland clubs (38 from the previous round and 4 level 5–7 entered this stage.
15 South Australian clubs (plus North Eastern MetroStars) progressed to this stage.
16 Tasmanian clubs (6 from the previous round and 10 level 2–3) entered this stage.
64 Victorian clubs (32 from the previous round and 32 level 2–3) entered this stage.
32 Western Australian clubs (21 from the previous round and 11 level 2) entered this stage.
Byes – 1 NNSW clubs (1 from the South Zone)
Fifth round:
8 Australian Capital Territory clubs (7 from the previous round and 1 level 2) entered this stage.
40 New South Wales clubs progressed to this stage.
12 Northern New South Wales clubs progressed to this stage.
8 Northern Territory clubs (4 from the previous round and 4 level 2) entered this stage.
32 Queensland clubs (21 from the previous round and 11 level 2) entered this stage.
7 South Australian clubs (plus North Eastern MetroStars) progressed to this stage.
8 Tasmanian clubs progressed to this stage.
32 Victorian clubs progressed to this stage.
16 Western Australian clubs progressed to this stage.
Byes – 4 NNSW clubs (4 from the South Zone)
Sixth round:
4 Australian Capital Territory clubs progressed to this stage.
20 New South Wales clubs progressed to this stage.
8 Northern New South Wales clubs progressed to this stage.
4 Northern Territory clubs progressed to this stage.
4 South Australian clubs progressed to this stage.
16 Queensland clubs progressed to this stage.
4 Tasmanian clubs progressed to this stage.
16 Victorian clubs progressed to this stage.
8 Western Australian clubs progressed to this stage.
Seventh round:
2 Australian Capital Territory clubs progressed to this stage. This was also the Final of the Federation Cup.
10 New South Wales clubs progressed to this stage. The 5 winners also participated in the Waratah Cup.
4 Northern New South Wales clubs progressed to this stage.
2 Northern Territory clubs progressed to this stage – the winners of the Darwin-based and Alice Springs-based knockout competitions. 
8 Queensland clubs progressed to this stage. The 2 Brisbane zone teams (not including the NPL Queensland teams) also played in the Final of the Canale Cup.
2 South Australian clubs progressed to this stage. This was also the Grand Final of the Federation Cup.
2 Tasmanian clubs progressed to this stage. This was also the Grand Final of the Milan Lakoseljac Cup.
8 Victorian clubs progressed to this stage. The 4 winners also qualified to the semi-finals of the Dockerty Cup.
4 Western Australian clubs progressed to this stage. The 2 winners will also play in the Cool Ridge Cup Final.
Note: North Eastern MetroStars SC also participated in some of the South Australian qualifying rounds, which were also part of the FFSA Federation Cup competition. MetroStars are not counted as a qualifier, as they had already qualified into the FFA Cup as 2014 National Premier Leagues champions.

Key to Abbreviations

Qualifying round

Notes:
 w/o = Walkover
 VIC Byes – Albert Park (8), Brandon Park (8), Casey Panthers (8), Chelsea FC (8), East Bentleigh (8), Harrisfield Hurricanes (8), Maidstone United (10), Melbourne Lions (8), Mill Park (8),  Reservoir Yeti (8), RMIT FC (8), Spring Hills (8), Springvale City (8), St Kevins Old Boys (8), Swinburne University (8), White Star Dandenong (8) and Yarra Jets (8).

First round

Notes:
 w/o = Walkover
 † = After Extra Time
 NNSW Byes – Urunga FC (4).
 QLD Byes – Beerwah Glasshouse United (3), Brothers Townsville FC (3), Buderim Wanderers (3), Caloundra FC (3), Coolum FC (3), Estates FC (4), Kawana SC (3), MA Olympic (3), Noosa Lions (3), Saints Eagles South (3), Townsville Warriors (3) and Wulguru United (3).

Second round

Notes:
 w/o = Walkover
 † = After Extra Time
 NNSW Byes – Nambucca Strikers (5), Newcastle Suns (4), Northern Companions (4)  and Jesmond FC (5).
 QLD Byes – Brighton Bulldogs (7), Broadbeach United (3), Mareeba United (3) and Stratford Dolphins (3).
 WA Byes – Backpackers FC (8), Busselton SC (5), East Fremantle (5), Eaton Dardanup (6), Emerald FC (10), Maccabi (6) and Perth Saints (5).

Third round

Notes:
 w/o = Walkover
 † = After Extra Time
 ACT Byes – Lanyon United (4), Queanbeyan City (3), Weston-Molonglo (4) and White Eagles (3).
 NSW Byes – Albion Park White Eagles (6), Ararat FC (7), Balmain Tigers (4), Bankstown Sports Strikers (6), Bonnet Bay (6), Bulli FC (6), Carlton Rovers (6), Central Sydney Wolves (9), Dulwich Hill (4), Earlwood Wanderers (6), Glebe Gorillas (6), Glenmore Park (6), Gosford City (6), Hills Brumbies (4), Hurlstone Park Wanderers (7), Hurstville City Minotaurs (5), Inter Lions (4), Kenthurst and District (6), Leppington Lions (7), Marayong Sports (6), North Epping Rangers (7), Oatley RSL (6), Padstow United (6), Pittwater RSL (6), Rydalmere Lions (4), Ryde Saints United (7), Southern Bulls (5), Sydney CBD FC (6), The Entrance Bateau Bay United (6), Werrington FC (9), Wollongong United (6), and Yagoona Lions (6).
 NNSW Byes – South Armidale United (4), Boambee (4) and Alstonville (4).
 NT Byes – Mindil Aces (2), Borroloola FC (2), Hellenic AC (2), 1st Brigade (3), Port Darwin (2) and Palmerston FC (2).
 QLD Byes – Emerald Eagles (3) and Frenchville FC (3).
 SA Byes – Adelaide Raiders (2), Para Hills Knights (2) and Salisbury United (3).
 TAS Byes – Beachside FC (3), Clarence United (3), Metro FC (3) and Southern FC (3).

Fourth round
295 teams took part in this stage of the competition, including approximately 200 qualifiers from the previous round and 100 entering at this stage from the NPL ACT (2), NPL NSW 1 (2), NPL VIC (2), NPL WA (2), NPL NSW 2 (3), NPL TAS (2) and the NPL VIC 1 West and East (3). The Northern Tasmanian champions (3) and Southern Tasmanian champions (3) also entered this round. The lowest ranked sides that qualified for this round were Central Sydney Wolves and Werrington FC. They were the only level 9 teams left in the competition.

Notes:
 w/o = Walkover
 † = After Extra Time
 NNSW Byes – South Cardiff (2).

Fifth round
164 teams took part in this stage of the competition, including 148 qualifiers from the previous round and 16 entering at this stage (11 from the NPL QLD (2), 4 from the Football in Central Australia League (2) and the 2014 ACT Federation Cup champion (2)). The lowest ranked side that qualified for this round was North Epping Rangers, the only level 7 team left in the competition.

Notes:
 † = After Extra Time
 NNSW Byes – Broadmeadow Magic (2), Valentine FC (3), Jesmond FC (5) and West Wallsend (3).

Sixth round
A total of 84 teams competed in this round of the competition. The 42 victorious teams in this round qualified for the Seventh Round. The lowest ranked sides that qualified for this round were Caulfield United Cobras, Kenthurst and District, Wollongong United and Yagoona Lions. They were the only level 6 teams left in the competition.

Notes:
 † = After Extra Time

Seventh round
A total of 42 teams competed in this round of the competition. The 21 victorious teams in this round qualified for the 2015 FFA Cup Round of 32. The lowest ranked sides that qualified for this round were Gwelup Croatia and Prospect United. They were the only level 5 teams left in the competition.

Notes:
 † = After Extra Time

References

External links
 Official website

FFA Cup preliminary
FFA Cup preliminary
Australia Cup preliminary rounds